Galle Cricket Club is a first-class cricket team based in Galle, Sri Lanka. They play their home games at Galle International Stadium, which was reconstructed after the 2004 Indian Ocean tsunami. In the 2016–17 season, they took part in the Premier Trophy, Sri Lankan cricket's first-class competition.

Notable players
 Late Douglas Dias Jayasinha
 Lasith Malinga
 Nuwan Kulasekara
 Romesh Kaluwitharana
 Champaka Ramanayake
 Jayananda Warnaweera
 Malinga Bandara
 Asoka de Silva

Partnership Records
1st – 104  HSS Fonseka & CM Withanage
2nd – 102  S Kodituwakku & TKD Sudarshana
3rd – 169* CM Withanage & WMPN Wanasinghe
4th – 183  S Kodituwakku & PD Rusintha
5th – 149  HSS Fonseka & DD Wickramasinghe
6th – 110  CRP Galappathy & CM Bandara
7th – 174  MKPB Kularatne & KMDN Kulasekara
8th – 154  PD Rusintha & LHD Dilhara
9th – 101  MMDPV Perera & MKPB Kularatne
10th – 87  DD Wickramasinghe & KG Perera

References

External links
 Galle Cricket Club at CricketArchive
 Galle Cricket Club website

Sri Lankan first-class cricket teams
Sport in Galle